Sir Neale Porter  was a British colonial governor. He was Chief magistrate of Anguilla from March 1869 until May 1871. He also served in Antigua, Dominica and Montserrat for a total of 26 years.  He was appointed KCMG in the 1894 New Year Honours

References

Chief magistrates of Anguilla
Governors of Dominica
Governors of Montserrat
Knights Commander of the Order of St Michael and St George